East Cadiz is an unincorporated community in Harrison County, in the U.S. state of Ohio.

History
East Cadiz lies east of the city of Cadiz, hence the name.  A variant name was Greenough. A post office called Greenough was established in 1893, and remained in operation until 1914.

References

Unincorporated communities in Harrison County, Ohio
Unincorporated communities in Ohio